The Huron–Manistee National Forests are two separate national forests, the Huron National Forest and the Manistee National Forest, combined in 1945 for administration purposes and which comprise  of public lands, including  of wetlands, extending across the northern lower peninsula of Michigan. The Huron–Manistee National Forests provide recreation opportunities for visitors, habitat for fish and wildlife, and resources for local industry. The headquarters for the forests is in Cadillac, Michigan.

History

The Huron National Forest was established in 1909 and the Manistee National Forest in 1938. In 1945, they were administratively combined, although they are not adjacent. Huron has about 44.8% of the combined area, whereas the larger Manistee has about 55.2%.

The Huron National Forest is prone to frequent seasonal forest fires, due to ecological and geological factors including the domination of the jack pine in sections of the forests, the needles of which are extremely flammable, sandy soil composition as a result of glacial outwash plain geology of sections of the Huron National Forest, and jack pine barrens management practices to create nesting habitat for the Kirtland's warbler resulting in dense, young stands of jack pine that are extremely susceptible to crowning wildfires.

The fire destroyed 13 homes, damaged two others, and destroyed or damaged 46 outbuildings.

Features

Huron–Manistee boasts thousands of lakes and miles of sparkling  rivers and streams. The nationally known Pere Marquette and Au Sable Rivers offer quality canoeing and fishing.

The Huron–Manistee National Forests are an attraction to many campers. You do not need a permit to camp on the National Forest campgrounds. However, some do require that one pays a reservation or camping fee. A wood permit is required to cut firewood.

The Manistee National Forest portion is located in northwest lower Michigan. It has varying but largely sandy terrain covered with trees. There are numerous lakes and frontage on Lake Michigan. The area is popular for fishing, camping, boating, snowmobiling, cross-country skiing and hunting. The North Country Trail passes through it. In descending order of land area it lies in parts of Lake, Newaygo, Wexford, Manistee, Mason, Oceana, Muskegon, Mecosta, and Montcalm counties. There are local ranger district offices located in Baldwin and Wellston at the historic Chittenden Nursery location.

The Manistee National Forest is not one continuous mass but is broken by private property and towns. Much of the land had been abandoned by logging companies after being logged off a century ago. The Lumberjack 100, a 100-mile ultra-endurance mountain bike race is held annually within its bounds.

The Nordhouse Dunes Wilderness is a unique feature in the Manistee portion. Most of the dunes are 3500 to 4000 years old and some stand about  higher than the lake. The Nordhouse Dunes are interspersed with woody vegetation such as juniper, jack pine and hemlock. There are many small water holes and marshes dotting the landscape and dune grass covers many of the dunes. The beach is wide and sandy. There are two trailheads to access Nordhouse Dunes: from the north at the Lake Michigan Recreation Site and from the south off Nurmberg Road.

The Huron National Forest portion is in northeast lower Michigan. It lies in parts of Oscoda, Alcona, Iosco, Crawford, and Ogemaw counties. There are local ranger district offices in Mio and Oscoda.

The Bull Gap ORV Trail is located in the Huron portion. It contains  of ORV trails.

The threatened Kirtland's warbler nests in the area, and tours are available, subject to time restrictions.

See also
 Michigan AuSable Valley Railroad
 Nordhouse Dunes Wilderness - Lake Michigan Recreation Site & Nurmberg Road Trailhead
 Lumbermans Monument

References

External links

 
National Forests of Michigan
1909 establishments in Michigan  
1938 establishments in Michigan  
Important Bird Areas of Michigan
Northern Michigan
Protected areas of Lake County, Michigan
Protected areas of Newaygo County, Michigan
Protected areas of Wexford County, Michigan
Protected areas of Manistee County, Michigan
Protected areas of Mason County, Michigan
Protected areas of Oceana County, Michigan
Protected areas of Muskegon County, Michigan
Protected areas of Mecosta County, Michigan
Protected areas of Montcalm County, Michigan
Protected areas of Oscoda County, Michigan
Protected areas of Alcona County, Michigan
Protected areas of Iosco County, Michigan
Protected areas of Crawford County, Michigan
Protected areas of Ogemaw County, Michigan
Landmarks in Michigan